Qasim Beg, formerly known as Qasim Nisar, is an English kickboxer in the Super Lightweight division.

Personal life
Beg was born to in Birmingham, England to a British Pakistani family of Mughal descent. Beg initially studied Karate, however decided he wanted to engage in a more practical sport and took up Kickboxing.

Within two and a half years Beg went on to win the English National title, two British titles, the European Championship and the Amateur World Championship belt, stating his goal was to compete at a professional world level.

Amateur career
Beg took part in his first Amateur full contact bout in May 2005 and went 21-0-1, winning 14 of those by way of stoppage.

Beg also remained unbeaten in 30 ring light continuous bouts. He has won an English Championship, 3 versions of the British title, 3 versions of the European crown and 2 versions of the World title.

Professional career
In October 2007, Beg contested his first Professional full contact fight and he remains unbeaten to date.

Cancelled WKA World Championship
In 2011, Beg was to fly out to Westbury, New York for a world title bout against three times World Champion Bobby Campbell for the WKA belt, in a highly anticipated match-up many predicted would play into Begs favor.

Campbell, who had previously fended off five challengers for the belt, stated "(Beg) is undefeated in all of his amateur and pro fights...We look forward to fighting Qasim, as we feel he is one of the best in world, and I always take on the best..."

Beg stated he was eager to travel to New York to take on the "great fighter", however the fight never took place.

Comeback
After two and a half years off, Beg returned to the sport on 24 March 2013 in a match-up against Edward Bettison, Beg managed to floor his opponent twice before going onto win.

His second comeback fight will take place on 16 June 2013, for a British title.

Outside kickboxing

Charity Work
In 2010, Beg helped raise funds for Cancer Research UK by taking part in an event where he took on 50 opponents for five hours, the event took place at USKA Gym, Montgomery Street, Sparkbrook, and was free for everyone to attend.

Music career
Beg has previously had a Rapping career, whereby he went under the alias 'Kastro'. He was a member of the birmingham based "SHM" (Small Heath Mandems)

Accomplishments
 F.I.S.T English National Champion (Light Continuous)
 F.I.S.T British Champion (Light Continuous)
 W.A.K.O Amateur ring sports British open Champion (Light Continuous) 2005
 W.A.K.O European junior open Champion (Light Continuous) 2005
 I.S.K.A European Champion (Light Continuous) 2006
 I.S.K.A Light Weight Midland Area Champion (Full Contact)
 60 kg Golden Belt Champion (Full Contact)
 Nordic Open Champion 2006 (Light Continuous) 2006
 I.S.K.A British Champion (Light Continuous) 2006
 I.S.K.A Light Weight English National Champion (Full Contact)
 I.S.K.A Super Lightweight British Champion (Full Contact)
 WAKO British Super Lightweight Champion 2007 (Full Contact)
 I.S.K.A European Champion 2007 (Light Continuous)
 I.S.K.A Super Lightweight European Champion (Full Contact)
 Golden Belt -62 kg European Champion (Full Contact)
 I.S.K.A Super Lightweight World Champion (Full Contact)
 W.P.K.C Super Lightweight World Champion (Full Contact)
 I.S.K.A Midlands Open Champion (Light Continuous) 2008
 I.S.K.A English Open Champion (Light Continuous) 2009
 I.S.K.A Professional Super Lightweight English Champion
 I.S.K.A European Champion 2009 (Light Continuous)
 I.K.F Professional British Lightweight Champion
 ICO British Champion 2010 (Light Continuous)

See also
British Pakistanis
Imran Khan (kickboxer)

References

External links
  Qasim 'the dream' Beg Official Website. 
  Qasim 'the dream' Official Twitter page. 
  'QASIM THE DREAM KO COMPILATION'

1989 births
Living people
English male kickboxers
Pakistani male kickboxers
Lightweight kickboxers
Sportspeople from Birmingham, West Midlands
English people of Pakistani descent
Muhajir people
Pakistani male boxers
British sportspeople of Pakistani descent